The West Northamptonshire Development Corporation (WNDC) was an urban Development Corporation to secure the regeneration of the Urban Development Areas of Daventry, Towcester and Northampton in Northamptonshire, England.

It was established in December 2004 under the provisions of the Local Government, Planning and Land Act 1980 by Jeff Rooker, signed by the authority of the First Secretary of State.

The corporation acted as a local planning authority before being dissolved on 31 March 2014.

Executive Team
The July 2010 Executive Team was:
 
Peter Mawson, Chief Executive
Roger Mendonca, Deputy Chief Executive
Chris Garden, Director of Regeneration and Development
Adrian Arnold, Director of Planning Services
Bill Allen, Director of Implementation and Delivery

Projects
As of July 2010 had invested more than £70 million in regeneration schemes across the three sites. The threshold for residential planning applications determined by WNDC was raised from 50 to 200 units in 2011.

Northampton
The redevelopment of Castle Railway Station
The regeneration of Northampton's waterside
£1.4 million to support arts facilities in the town centre and the Royal and Derngate theatre
£7.4 million to flood defences
£10.8 million to resurrect derelict Brownfield land for development
£6 million to create safer, attractive, more pedestrian friendly streets from the railway through to All Saints Square
£1.8 million for a new marina in Becket's Park as part of wider waterside development 
Investment in a series of three new roads in the south west of the town 
Investment in the redevelopment of the market square

Daventry
£9 million was spent to initiate:
A doubling of the town's retail and commercial floor space 
The creation of 2,000 new jobs
£60 million of private investment
Construction of the landmark iCon centre for sustainable construction
Provision of a new and improved town centre library

Towcester
Over £6 million was invested in Towcester Town Centre to support:
A quality public space in the centre of the town
New community, leisure and cultural facilities
The renovation of Bury Mount and the Water Meadows
New jobs for local people

iCon
The iCon building in Daventry was under construction as of 2010, and became a landmark building for the town. This national centre of excellence for sustainable construction and green technologies, provides accommodation, support and advice for 55 businesses, has a 300 seat conference hall, a public piazza and a café/restaurant.

The building has also won a Green Apple Award for the built Environment and Architectural Heritage. The Green Apple Awards, presented by The Green Organisation, are part of an annual international campaign to recognise, reward and promote environmental practice around the world

This £9 million project was funded by WNDC, the European Regional Development Fund (ERDF) and East Midlands Development Agency.

References

External links
West Northamptonshire Development Corporation (GOV.UK

2004 establishments in the United Kingdom
2014 disestablishments in the United Kingdom
Department for Levelling Up, Housing and Communities
Government agencies established in 2004
Government agencies disestablished in 2014
Defunct public bodies of the United Kingdom
Development Corporations of the United Kingdom
Economy of Northamptonshire